Michael Veith (born 20 January 1957) is a German former alpine skier who competed in the 1976 Winter Olympics and 1980 Winter Olympics.

External links
 sports-reference.com
 

1957 births
Living people
German male alpine skiers
Olympic alpine skiers of West Germany
Alpine skiers at the 1976 Winter Olympics
Alpine skiers at the 1980 Winter Olympics
Place of birth missing (living people)
20th-century German people